Attila Sallustro (15 December 1908 – 28 May 1983) was a professional Italian–Paraguayan footballer who played as a striker. He is considered an important player in S.S.C. Napoli's history, and became extremely popular with the fans during his time with the club.

Early life
Sallustro was born in Asunción, Paraguay to Italian parents, but moved to Naples in Italy, with his family as a youngster. He came from a wealthy background and his father wanted him to play football in Italy.

Club career

Napoli
He joined Napoli when they were first known as Internaples and stayed on with the club for the majority of his career. At Napoli he was nicknamed "Il Veltro" and "Il Divino". Due to his background, Sallustro chose not to take any financial pay from the club, though he was rewarded with a luxury motor car.

At Napoli he played for 12 years, scoring 107 goals, in a career which was halted at one point due to World War II. He had a brother two years his junior, named Oreste Sallustro (referred to sometimes as Sallustro II). The two played together at Napoli though Oreste appeared less frequently. After retiring from football he stayed in Naples where he died in 1983.

International career
He was called up in the Italy national football team twice in 1929 and scored for them once. One of the games in which he played was a 6–1 defeat of Portugal. Sallustro along with Marcello Mihalic was the first Napoli player to be called up in the Italy national team. He made one start in the silver winning 1931-32 Central European International Cup campaign, in the 3-0 win against Switzerland.

Despite his goal-scoring pedigree at club level, he was kept out of the side during much of his playing days due largely to the inclusion of Giuseppe Meazza. This was famously much to the dismay of some Neapolitans who thought his exclusion from the squad was unjust.

Honours 
Italy
 Central European International Cup: Runner-up: 1931-32

References

1908 births
1983 deaths
Paraguayan footballers
Paraguayan expatriates in Italy
Paraguayan people of Italian descent
Italian footballers
Serie A players
Serie B players
S.S.C. Napoli players
U.S. Salernitana 1919 players
S.S.C. Napoli managers
Serie A managers
Italy international footballers
Italian football managers
Association football forwards